Dzilebki (Dargwa: ЗилебкӀи) is a rural locality (a selo) in Uraginsky Selsoviet, Dakhadayevsky District, Republic of Dagestan, Russia. The population was 711 as of 2010. There are 6 streets.

Geography 
Dzilebki is located 30 km southwest of Urkarakh (the district's administrative centre) by road. Urtsaki and Kubachi are the nearest rural localities.

Nationalities 
Dargins live there.

External links 
Необычная свадьба | село Дзилебки | 4.10.2020

References 

Rural localities in Dakhadayevsky District